The fictional superhero Batman, who appears in American comic books published by DC Comics, has appeared in various films since his inception. Created by Bob Kane and Bill Finger, the character first starred in two serial films in the 1940s: Batman and Batman and Robin. The character also appeared in the 1966 film Batman, which was a feature film adaptation of the 1960s Batman TV series starring Adam West and Burt Ward, who also starred in the film. Toward the end of the 1980s, the Warner Bros. studio began producing a series of feature films starring Batman, beginning with the 1989 film Batman, directed by Tim Burton and starring Michael Keaton. Burton and Keaton returned for the 1992 sequel Batman Returns, and in 1995, Joel Schumacher directed Batman Forever with Val Kilmer as Batman. Schumacher also directed the 1997 sequel Batman & Robin, which starred George Clooney. Batman & Robin was poorly received by both critics and fans, leading to the cancellation of Batman Unchained.

Following the cancellation of two further film proposals, the franchise was rebooted in 2005 with Batman Begins, directed by Christopher Nolan and starring Christian Bale. Nolan returned to direct two further installments through the release of The Dark Knight in 2008 and The Dark Knight Rises in 2012, with Bale reprising his role in both films. Both sequels earned over $1 billion worldwide, making Batman the second film franchise to have two of its films earn more than $1 billion worldwide. Referred to as "The Dark Knight Trilogy", the critical acclaim and commercial success of Nolan's films have been credited with restoring widespread popularity to the superhero, with the second installment considered one of the best superhero movies of all time.

After Warner Bros. launched their own shared cinematic universe known as the DC Extended Universe in 2013, Ben Affleck was cast to portray Batman in the new expansive franchise, first appearing in 2016 with the Zack Snyder-directed film Batman v Superman: Dawn of Justice. The film would begin a sequence of further DC Comics adaptations, including Justice League and Zack Snyder's Justice League crossover films featuring other DC Comics characters, and the stand-alone film The Batman, directed by Matt Reeves, with Robert Pattinson in the role. Affleck and Keaton will both reprise the role of Batman in the upcoming DCEU film The Flash (2022). Keaton was also due to reprise his role in the Leslie Grace-led HBO Max film Batgirl, but it was shelved and is unlikely to ever be released.

The series has grossed over $4.99 billion at the global box office, making it the eleventh highest-grossing film franchise of all time. Batman has also appeared in multiple animated films, both as a starring character and as an ensemble character. While most animated films were released direct-to-video, the 1993 animated feature Batman: Mask of the Phantasm (based on the 1990s Batman: The Animated Series) and 2017's The Lego Batman Movie (a spin-off of 2014's The Lego Movie) were released theatrically. Having earned an unadjusted total of U.S. $2,783,118,504, the Batman series is the fourth-highest-grossing film series in North America.

List of films

1940s serials

Batman (1943) 

Batman was a 15-chapter serial film released in 1943 by Columbia Pictures and was the first appearance of the comic book character on film. The serial starred Lewis Wilson as Batman and Douglas Croft as Robin. Being a World War II era production, the movie serial like many of this period was used as war-time propaganda and had an anti-Japanese bent with J. Carrol Naish playing the Japanese villain, an original character named Dr. Daka. Rounding out the cast were Shirley Patterson as Linda Page (Bruce Wayne's love interest), and William Austin as Alfred. The plot is based on Batman, a US government agent, attempting to defeat the Japanese agent Dr. Daka, at the height of World War II.

The film is notable for being the first filmed appearance of Batman and for providing two core elements of the Batman mythos. The film introduced "The Bat's Cave" and the Grandfather clock entrance. The name was altered to the Batcave for the comic. William Austin, who played Alfred, had a trim physique and sported a thin mustache, while the contemporary comic book version of Alfred was overweight and clean-shaven prior to the serial's release. The comics version of Alfred was altered to match that of Austin's, and has stayed that way.

Batman and Robin (1949) 

Batman and Robin was another 15-chapter serial film released in 1949 by Columbia Pictures. Robert Lowery played Batman, while Johnny Duncan played Robin. Supporting players included Jane Adams as Vicki Vale and veteran character actor Lyle Talbot as Commissioner Gordon. The plot dealt with the Dynamic Duo facing off against the Wizard, a hooded villain whose identity remains a mystery throughout the serial until the end.

1960s

Batman: The Movie (1966) 

Batman (also known as Batman: The Movie) is a 1966 film adaptation of the popular Batman television series, and was the first full-length theatrical adaptation of the DC Comics character. The 20th Century Fox release starred Adam West as Batman and Burt Ward as Robin, as well as Lee Meriwether as Catwoman, Cesar Romero as the Joker, Burgess Meredith as the Penguin and Frank Gorshin as the Riddler.

The film was directed by Leslie H. Martinson, who also directed for the series a pair of season one episodes: "The Penguin Goes Straight" and "Not Yet, He Ain't".

1970s and 80s 
In the late 1970s, Batman's popularity was waning. CBS was interested in producing a Batman in Outer Space film. Producers Michael Uslan and Benjamin Melniker purchased the film rights of Batman from DC Comics on October 3, 1979. It was Uslan's wish "to make the definitive, dark, serious version of Batman, the way Bob Kane and Bill Finger had envisioned him in 1939. A creature of the night; stalking criminals in the shadows." Richard Maibaum was approached to write a script with Guy Hamilton to direct, but the two turned down the offer. Uslan was unsuccessful with pitching Batman to various movie studios because they wanted the film to be similar to the campy 1960s TV series. Columbia Pictures and United Artists were among those to turn down the film.

A disappointed Uslan then wrote a script titled Return of the Batman to give the film industry a better idea of his vision for the film. Uslan later compared its dark tone to that of The Dark Knight Returns, which his script pre-dated by six years. In November 1979, producer Jon Peters and Casablanca FilmWorks, headed by Peter Guber, joined the project. The four producers felt it was best to pattern the film's development after that of Superman (1978). Uslan, Melniker and Guber pitched Batman to Universal Pictures, but the studio turned it down. The project was publicly announced with a budget of $15 million in July 1980 at the Comic Art Convention in New York. Casablanca FilmWorks was absorbed into PolyGram Pictures in 1980. Guber and Peters left PolyGram Pictures in 1982 and took the Batman film rights with them, although PolyGram would retain at least 7.5% of the profits of said rights due to a contractual agreement. Guber and Peters immediately set up shop at Warner Bros., which finally decided to accept Batman.

Tom Mankiewicz completed a script titled The Batman in June 1983, focusing on Batman and Dick Grayson's origins, with the Joker and Rupert Thorne as villains, and Silver St. Cloud as the romantic interest. Mankiewicz took inspiration from Steve Englehart's and Marshall Rogers's 1970s run in Detective Comics (later reprinted in the trade paperback Batman: Strange Apparitions),, with Rogers himself being hired to provide concept art. The Batman was then announced in late 1983 for a mid-1985 release date on a budget of $20 million. Originally, Mankiewicz had wanted an unknown actor for Batman, William Holden for James Gordon, David Niven as Alfred Pennyworth and Peter O'Toole as the Penguin, who Mankiewicz wanted to portray as a mobster with low body temperature. Holden died in 1981 and Niven in 1983, so this would never come to pass. A number of filmmakers were attached to Mankiewicz' script, including Ivan Reitman and Joe Dante. Reitman wanted to cast Bill Murray as Batman. Eddie Murphy and Michael J. Fox were candidates for the role of Robin. Nine rewrites were performed by nine separate writers. Most of them were based on Strange Apparitions. However, Mankiewicz's script was still being used to guide the project.

Tim Burton and Joel Schumacher series (1989–1997)

Filmography

Batman (1989) 

Tim Burton took over as director of the first Batman film in 1986. Steve Englehart and Julie Hickson wrote film treatments before Sam Hamm wrote the first screenplay. Numerous A-list actors were considered for the role of Batman before Michael Keaton was cast. Keaton was a controversial choice for the role since, by 1988, he had become typecast as a comedic actor and many observers doubted he could portray a serious role. Jack Nicholson accepted the role of the Joker under strict conditions that dictated a high salary, a portion of the box office profits and his shooting schedule. Nicholson's final salary is reported to be as high as $50 million. Principal photography took place at Pinewood Studios from October 1988 to January 1989. The budget escalated from $30 million to $48 million, while the 1988 Writers Guild of America strike forced Hamm to drop out. Rewrites were performed by Warren Skaaren, Charles McKeown and Jonathan Gems. Batman received positive reviews, broke numerous box office records, and won the Academy Award for Best Art Direction. The film grossed over $400 million, and left a legacy over the modern perception of the superhero film genre.

Batman Returns (1992) 

Burton originally did not want to direct a sequel because of his mixed emotions over the previous film. Sam Hamm's first script had the Penguin and Catwoman searching for hidden treasure. Daniel Waters delivered a script that satisfied Burton, which convinced him to direct the film. Wesley Strick went uncredited for writing the shooting draft, deleting the Robin character, reworking the Penguin's characterization and "normalizing" all dialogue. Strick remained as the on-set writer throughout the production process and received top-billing screenplay credit the early trailers, while Waters had sole story credit. Various A-list actresses lobbied hard for the role of Catwoman before Michelle Pfeiffer was cast, while Danny DeVito signed on to portray the Penguin. Filming started at Warner Bros. in Burbank, California in June 1991. Batman Returns was released with financial success, but Warner Bros. was disappointed with the film's box office run because it earned less than its predecessor. However, Batman Returns was released to generally positive reviews, with praise for its action sequences, performances, Danny Elfman's score, effects and villains, although its dark tone and high level of violence for a PG-13 film was criticized. McDonald's shut down its Happy Meal tie-in for Batman Returns.

Batman Forever (1995) 

Although Batman Returns was a financial success, Warner Bros. felt the film should have made more money. The studio decided to change the direction of the Batman film series to be more mainstream. Joel Schumacher replaced Tim Burton as director, while Burton decided to stay on as producer. However, Michael Keaton did not like the new direction the film series was heading in, and was replaced by Val Kilmer as Batman. Chris O'Donnell was introduced as Robin, Jim Carrey starred as The Riddler, while Tommy Lee Jones starred as Two-Face. Filming started in September 1994, and Schumacher found Kilmer and Jones difficult to work with. Batman Forever was released on June 16, 1995, with financial success, earning over $350 million worldwide and three Academy Award nominations. The film received mixed reviews from critics, with criticism directed towards the CGI, Kilmer's performance, costume designs and tonal departure from previous films, but praising the visuals, action sequences and performances of Carrey and Jones.

Batman & Robin (1997) 

After the release of Batman Forever, Warner Bros. started development on Batman & Robin, commissioning it on fast track for an adamant June 1997 release. Val Kilmer did not return, because of scheduling conflicts with The Saint, and was replaced by George Clooney. Arnold Schwarzenegger starred as Mr. Freeze, while Uma Thurman played Poison Ivy, Alicia Silverstone played Batgirl, and Robert Swenson played Bane. Chris O'Donnell reprised his role as Robin. Michael Gough and Pat Hingle are the only cast members to appear in all four films as Alfred Pennyworth and Commissioner Gordon respectively. Principal photography began in September 1996 and finished in January 1997, two weeks ahead of the shooting schedule.

Batman & Robin was released on June 20, 1997, and received primarily negative reviews. Observers criticized the film for its toyetic and campy approach, and for homosexual innuendos added by Schumacher. The film was a financial success, but remains the least commercially successful live-action Batman film. Batman & Robin received numerous nominations at the Razzie Awards and ranks among the worst rated superhero films of all time.

Proposals for a fifth film

Batman Unchained 
During the filming of Batman & Robin, Warner Bros. was impressed with the dailies, prompting them to immediately hire Joel Schumacher to reprise his directing duties for a third film. Writer Akiva Goldsman, who worked on Batman Forever and Batman & Robin, turned down the chance to write the script. In late 1996, Warner Bros. and Schumacher hired Mark Protosevich to write the script for a fifth Batman film. A projected mid-1999 release date was announced. Los Angeles Times described their film as "continuing in the same vein with multiple villains and more silliness". Schumacher, however, later claimed that the film would have been darker and closer in tone to the first two films in the series. Titled Batman Unchained but often incorrectly referred to as Batman Triumphant, Protosevich's script had the Scarecrow as the main villain and the Joker would return as a hallucination in Batman's mind caused by the Scarecrow's fear toxin. Harley Quinn would appear as a supporting character, written as the Joker's daughter trying to kill Batman to avenge her father's death. The film would have depicted the Scarecrow and Harley Quinn teaming up to drive Batman insane and have him committed to Arkham Asylum. After their defeat, the film would have ended with Bruce Wayne traveling to Bali and entering a cave, where he allows himself to be swarmed by bats to symbolize that he has conquered fear. Clooney, O'Donnell, and Silverstone were set to reprise the roles of Batman, Robin, and Batgirl. Schumacher had also approached Nicolas Cage for the role of Scarecrow in Batman & Robin as a cameo appearance to set up an appearance in Batman Unchained, before ultimately casting Coolio.

A fifth film would likely have appeared 18 months to two years after the fourth. When Batman & Robin received negative reviews and failed to outgross any of its predecessors, and a $150 million Superman film was canceled three months before shooting began, Warner Bros. became unsure of its plans for the fifth film.

Batman: DarKnight 
Despite Warner Bros. and Schumacher's interest with Year One, Lee Shapiro, a comic book fan, and Stephen Wise pitched the studio with a script titled Batman: DarKnight in mid-1998. DarKnight, which was largely inspired by The Dark Knight Returns, had Bruce Wayne giving up his crime fighting career after becoming disillusioned with his alias's inability to inspire fear and mystique in his enemies, and Dick Grayson attending Gotham University. Dr. Jonathan Crane uses his position as professor of psychology at Gotham University and as head psychiatrist at Arkham Asylum to conduct his fear experiments (this element would later appear in Batman Begins). During a vengeful confrontation with a colleague, Dr. Kirk Langstrom, Crane unknowingly initiates Kirk's transformation into the creature known as Man-Bat. Citizens of Gotham believe Man-Bat's nightly activities to be Batman's "bloodthirsty" return. Bruce once again becomes Batman "to clear his name," and solve the mystery of Man-Bat. Kirk struggles with his "man-vs.-monster" syndrome, as he longs to both reunite with his wife and get revenge on Crane, while Crane exacts revenge on those responsible for his dismissal from both Arkham and the university while encountering truths about his past. As with Schumacher's idea for Batman Unchained, the film would have had a darker tone. Warner Bros. Pictures formally decided not to move forward with the project in 2001, and passed on Batman: DarKnight in favor of other projects. In 2015, the screenplay was released on Amazon.

Robin spin-off 
Chris O'Donnell revealed in a 2012 interview with Access Hollywood that a Robin spin-off had been considered; the project was cancelled after Batman & Robin.

Batgirl
In December 2021, Keaton was revealed to be appearing in the DC Extended Universe film Batgirl, reprising his role from Batman and Batman Returns. Keaton had been expected to first reprise the role for the DCEU in The Flash prior to that film's delay to 2023. Batgirl was ultimately cancelled in post-production.

OnStar commercials 

The Batman OnStar commercials were a series of six television commercials featuring Batman, created by ad-agency Campbell-Ewald and aired from 2000 to the beginning of 2002.

The ads were based on the Tim Burton and Joel Schumacher films of the 1980s and 1990s, and used aesthetics, props, and settings from the series, in addition to the Elfman theme from the Tim Burton films. Actor Bruce Thomas portrayed Batman in these ads, while Michael Gough reprised his role of Alfred Pennyworth in one of the ads. Baywatch actress Brooke Burns played Vicki Vale in an ad as well. Actor Brian Stepanek played the Riddler in one ad and Curtis Armstrong played the Joker in another.

Abandoned reboot attempts (1999–2007)

Batman vs. Superman 
In 1999 new Warner studio head Alan Horn promised five tent-poles a year. He wanted to revive the Batman and Superman franchises as tentpoles. Wolfgang Petersen was to direct Superman: Flyby, but Andrew Kevin Walker pitched Warner Bros. an idea titled Batman vs Superman with as director. Superman: Flyby was put on hold, and Akiva Goldsman was hired to rewrite Walker's Batman vs. Superman.

Goldsman's draft, dated June 21, 2002, had Bruce Wayne going through a mental breakdown after his five-year retirement from crime fighting. Dick Grayson, Alfred Pennyworth, and Commissioner Gordon are all dead, but Bruce finds some solace in his fiancée, Elizabeth Miller. Meanwhile, Clark Kent is struggling because of a recent divorce from Lois Lane. Clark and Bruce are close friends, and Clark is Bruce's best man. After the Joker kills Elizabeth on their honeymoon, Bruce swears revenge, while Clark tries to hold him back. Bruce blames Clark for her death, and the two go against one another. Ultimately, Lex Luthor is revealed to have masterminded the entire plot to get Batman and Superman to destroy each other. The two decide to team up and stop Luthor. Bale was approached to portray Batman, while Josh Hartnett was offered the role of Superman.

Filming was to start in early 2003, with plans for a five- to six-month shoot. The release date was set for the summer of 2004. However, Warner Bros. canceled development to focus on individual Superman and Batman projects after J. J. Abrams submitted another draft for Superman: Flyby. According to Petersen "[Warner Bros.' chief] Alan Horn was so torn, because it's such a fascinating concept to do a Batman versus Superman film". Horn reportedly preferred Abrams' optimistic Superman script to the darker Batman vs. Superman script; studio executives voted 11-1 for the former. Many comic book fans agreed; David S. Goyer said, "'Batman Vs. Superman' is where you go when you admit to yourself that you've exhausted all possibilities ... somewhat of an admission that this franchise is on its last gasp". Since the decision left the studio without a Batman film for 2004, Warner quickly made Catwoman, which performed poorly at the box office and is considered among the worst films ever made.

Batman Beyond 
The studio decided it was best to consider a live-action Batman Beyond film and an adaptation of Frank Miller's Batman: Year One. Warner Bros. would then greenlight whichever idea suited them the most. By September 2000, Warner Bros. was developing a live action screen adaptation of Batman Beyond, written by Paul Dini, Neal Stephenson and Boaz Yakin, with the possibility of Yakin directing.

Despite interest from Schumacher, the studio amazed and pleased fans by hiring Darren Aronofsky to direct and co-write with Miller, whom he previously collaborated with on an unproduced script for Ronin. Yakin developed one draft of the Batman Beyond screenplay with the writers but soon lost interest.

Batman: Year One
Warner Bros. abandoned Batman Beyond almost instantly in favor of an adaptation of Frank Miller's 1987 comic book story arc Batman: Year One. After Batman and Robin, Schumacher felt he "owe[d] the Batman culture a real Batman movie. I would go back to the basics and make a dark portrayal of the Dark Knight." He had approached Warner Bros. to adapt Batman: Year One in mid-1998. Aronofsky and Miller intended to reboot the Batman franchise, "it's somewhat based on the comic book," Aronofsky said. "Toss out everything you can imagine about Batman! Everything! We're starting completely anew." Regular Aronofsky collaborator, Matthew Libatique, was set as cinematographer. At the same time, Warner Bros. was moving forward on a Catwoman spin-off.

Christian Bale had been approached for the role of Batman. Bale would later be cast in the role for Batman Begins. Aronofsky pursued Joaquin Phoenix for the lead role while Warner Bros. favored Freddie Prinze, Jr. The Aronofsky-Miller script had a brooding Batman and realistic violence, and would also have been R-rated.

In June 2002, the studio decided to move forward on Batman vs. Superman and abandon Year One.

Justice League: Mortal 

In February 2007, during pre-production for The Dark Knight, Warner Bros. hired husband and wife screenwriting duo Michelle and Kieran Mulroney to script a Justice League film featuring a younger Batman in a separate franchise. George Miller was hired to direct the following September, with Armie Hammer cast as Batman a month later and Teresa Palmer as Talia al Ghul. Filming had nearly commenced at Fox Studios Australia in Sydney, but was pushed back over the Writers Guild of America strike, and once more when the Australian Film Commission denied Warner Bros. a 45 percent tax rebate over lack of Australian actors in the film. Production offices were moved to Vancouver Film Studios in Canada for an expected July 2008 start and a planned summer 2009 theatrical release date, but Warner Bros. ultimately canceled Justice League following the success of The Dark Knight. Hammer's option on his contract lapsed and the studio was more willing to proceed with Christopher Nolan to finish his trilogy separately with The Dark Knight Rises.

The Dark Knight trilogy (2005–2012) 

The Dark Knight Trilogy consists of Batman Begins (2005), The Dark Knight (2008), and The Dark Knight Rises (2012), all directed by Christopher Nolan. Collectively grossing over $2.4 billion at the worldwide box office, the trilogy has been ranked among the greatest ever made.

Filmography

Batman Begins (2005) 

Following a rejected Batman origin story reboot Joss Whedon pitched in December 2002, Warner Bros. hired Christopher Nolan and David S. Goyer to script Batman Begins. The duo aimed for a darker and more realistic tone, with humanity and realism being the basis of the film. The film was primarily shot in the United Kingdom and Chicago, and relied on traditional stunts and scale models with minimal use of computer-generated imagery. Christian Bale starred as Batman, Liam Neeson as Ra's al Ghul, and Cillian Murphy as Jonathan Crane/The Scarecrow. Katie Holmes appears in the movie as Wayne's love interest, Rachel Dawes, a role created for the film. Alfred Pennyworth was played by Michael Caine, Jim Gordon was portrayed by Gary Oldman and Lucius Fox by Morgan Freeman. A new Batmobile (called the Tumbler) and a more mobile Batsuit were both created specifically for the film.

The film begins with the death of Bruce's parents and then explores his decision to leave Gotham and his training under the League of Shadows, with Ra's al Ghul, before he rebels against the League and adopts the guise of Batman, recognising that he cannot condone their use of lethal force. The League attempt to attack Gotham using Jonathan Crane's weaponised fear toxin, but Batman is able to defeat them. 

Batman Begins was both critically and commercially successful. The film opened on June 15, 2005, in the United States and Canada in 3,858 theaters. It grossed $48 million in its opening weekend, eventually grossing over $372 million worldwide. The film received an 85% overall approval rating from Rotten Tomatoes. Critics noted that fear was a common motif throughout the film, and remarked that it had a darker tone compared with previous Batman films. The film was listed at No. 81 on Empire's "500 Greatest Movies of All Time".

The Dark Knight (2008) 

Christopher Nolan reprised his duties as director, and brought his brother, Jonathan, to co-write the script for the second installment. The Dark Knight featured Christian Bale reprising his role as Batman/Bruce Wayne, Heath Ledger as The Joker, and Aaron Eckhart as Harvey Dent / Two-Face. Katie Holmes turned down her role as Rachel, and Maggie Gyllenhaal was cast instead. Principal photography began in April 2007 in Chicago and concluded in November. Other locations included Pinewood Studios, Ministry of Sound in London and Hong Kong. 

On January 22, 2008, after he had completed filming The Dark Knight, Ledger died from an accidental overdose of prescription medication. Warner Bros. had created a viral marketing campaign for The Dark Knight, developing promotional websites and trailers highlighting screen shots of Ledger as the Joker, but after Ledger's death, the studio refocused its promotional campaign.

The film depicts Batman fighting The Joker, aided by the prosecution of charismatic District Attorney Harvey Dent. The Joker tests Batman's resolve when he causes Rachel's death and Dent's transformation into the disfigured criminal Two-Face. Although Batman is able to stop the Joker from forcing two ferries - one loaded with civilians and the other with prisoners - to destroy each other, he is forced to take the blame for the murders committed by Dent to ensure that Gotham's citizens do not lose hope for the future. 

The Dark Knight received broad critical acclaim, and set numerous records during its theatrical run. With just over $1 billion in revenue worldwide, it became the 4th-highest-grossing film of all time, unadjusted for inflation. The film received eight Academy Award nominations; it won the award for Best Sound Editing and Ledger was posthumously awarded Best Supporting Actor. Critics and film writers often cite The Dark Knight as one of the best films of the 2000s.

The Dark Knight Rises (2012) 

Nolan wanted the story for the third and final installment to keep him emotionally invested. "On a more superficial level, I have to ask the question," he reasoned, "how many good third movies in a franchise can people name?" He returned out of finding a necessary way to continue the story, but feared midway through filming he would find a sequel redundant. The Dark Knight Rises is intended to complete Nolan's Batman trilogy. By December 2008, Nolan completed a rough story outline, before he committed himself to Inception. In February 2010, work on the screenplay was commencing with David S. Goyer and Jonathan Nolan. When Goyer left to work on the Superman reboot, Jonathan was writing the script based on the story by his brother and Goyer. Tom Hardy was cast as Bane and Anne Hathaway plays Selina Kyle. Joseph Gordon-Levitt was cast as Robin John Blake, and Marion Cotillard was cast as Miranda Tate. Filming began in May 2011 and concluded in November. Nolan chose not to film in 3-D but, by focusing on improving image quality and scale using the IMAX format, hoped to push technological boundaries while nevertheless making the style of the film consistent with the previous two. Nolan had several meetings with IMAX Vice-President David Keighley to work on the logistics of projecting films in digital IMAX venues. The Dark Knight Rises featured more scenes shot in IMAX than The Dark Knight. Cinematographer Wally Pfister expressed interest in shooting the film entirely in IMAX.

During the film, set eight years after Dark Knight, the arrival of new foe Bane forces Bruce to return to his old role as Batman, only to find himself overpowered and captured by Bane as Gotham is cut off from the rest of the world with a stolen Wayne Enterprises fusion generator prototype set to go off in a few months. With the aid of thief Selina Kyle, Bruce is able to return to Gotham and defeat Bane while redeeming his image as Batman. The film concludes with Bruce having 'retired' as Batman after faking his death to live with Selina Kyle, evidence suggesting that he has passed on the Batcave to Blake while Gotham rebuilds in memory of the Dark Knight's heroism. 

Upon release, The Dark Knight Rises received a positive critical response and was successful at the box office, going on to outgross its predecessor and become the 24th-highest-grossing film of all time grossing over $1.08 billion. It was named one of the best films of 2012 by numerous film critics, including the American Film Institute. It is considered one of the greatest superhero films of all time and one of the best films of the 2010s.

DC Extended Universe (2016–present)

Batman v Superman: Dawn of Justice (2016) 

On June 13, 2013, a source from Warner Bros. told The Wrap that they were discussing more Man of Steel films, as well as a Superman/Batman film, Wonder Woman, and Aquaman. Warner Bros. announced that Superman and Batman would unite in a new film, a follow-up to Man of Steel (2013), taking its inspiration from the comic The Dark Knight Returns and set for release in 2015. Goyer stated at the Superman 75th Anniversary Panel at Comic-Con, that Batman and Superman would face off, and titles under consideration were Superman vs Batman or Batman vs Superman. On August 22, 2013, The Hollywood Reporter announced the casting of Ben Affleck as Bruce Wayne/Batman. On January 17, 2014, it was announced that the film had been delayed from its original July 17, 2015, release date to May 6, 2016, in order to give the filmmakers "time to realize fully their vision, given the complex visual nature of the story". The film's release was moved again to March 25, 2016, "avoiding a high-profile showdown with Captain America: Civil War on May 6, 2016".

At some point prior to the events of the film, Wayne Manor has decayed, and Bruce and Alfred relocated to a smaller glass house above the Batcave. During the film, Lex Luthor manipulates Batman into perceiving Superman as an enemy, and at the same time kidnaps Martha Kent and demands Superman to kill Batman in exchange of Martha's life. Batman fights and nearly kills Superman with kryptonite weapons, but when a weak Superman pleads to Batman that he's "letting him kill Martha", a confused Batman remembers the death of his own mother, who shares the name. This confuses Batman enough time so Lois Lane arrives and explains the situation. Seeing how hard he has fallen, Batman saves Martha Kent from Luthor's minions, and then fights alongside Superman and Wonder Woman to contain the Kryptonian deformity Luthor created to kill Superman. Taking Luthor's metahuman files, Bruce states that he intends to gather the metahumans to prepare for an implied future threat.

Justice League (2017) 

Shortly after filming had finished for Man of Steel, Warner Bros hired Will Beall to script a new Justice League film in June 2012. With the release of Man of Steel in June 2013, Goyer was hired to write a new Justice League script, with the Beall draft being scrapped. In April 2014, it was announced that Zack Snyder would also be directing Goyer's Justice League script. Warner Bros. was reportedly courting Chris Terrio to rewrite Justice League the following July, after having been impressed with his rewrite of Batman v Superman. During post-production of the film, Zack Snyder left the film due to the death of his daughter. Joss Whedon took over the project and wrote and directed reshoots.

As part of the ensemble cast, Wayne serves as something of a leader to the Justice League. Additionally, he spearheads efforts to revive Superman in preparation for the upcoming assault from Steppenwolf, and brings Lois Lane to help calm down the enraged reanimated Superman.

Zack Snyder's Justice League (2021) 

The divisive reaction toward the final cut of Justice League, with Zack Snyder leaving directorial duties and the final cut of the film in the hands of Joss Whedon, has led to an argument comparing the situation to the one experienced by the film Superman II. Both Justice League and Superman II feature a director that was replaced, for different reasons, before the completion of a film, which led to a second director coming in and making substantial changes to the tone of each film. Although the reasoning behind each director's departure differs, Richard Donner was able to complete his cut of Superman II in 2005. In the belief that Snyder had shot enough material for a finished film, a campaign for a "Snyder Cut" was started to allow Snyder to receive a similar treatment to Donner. Arguments are made that Snyder's vision would be more cohesive to the previous films than the actual theatrical cut, which Snyder has refused to see. Warner Bros. initially remained silent regarding any intention of making a "Snyder Cut". In March 2019, Snyder confirmed his original cut does exist, and stated that it is up to Warner Bros. to release it. Despite this, in November, Variety reported that Warner Bros. was unlikely to release Snyder's version of Justice League in theaters or on HBO Max, calling it a "pipe dream". In December, however, Snyder posted a photo in his Vero account, which showed boxes with tapes labeled "Z.S. J.L Director's cut", and with the caption "Is it real? Does it exist? Of course it does." On May 20, 2020, Snyder officially announced that HBO Max will be releasing his cut of Justice League on their service in 2021. The cut will cost $70+ million to complete the special effects, musical score, editing, and additional shooting. While initially planned to be a four part miniseries, it was later clarified the cut would be released as a four hour long movie. Snyder stated this version will be non-canonical to DC Extended Universe continuity, but it would exist in a slightly alternate universe. Affleck, Miller, Fisher, Heard, and Manganiello returned to their respective roles for additional photography, in order to finish the project, with Jared Leto also reprising his role as The Joker from Suicide Squad.

The Flash (2023) 

In June 2020, Michael Keaton entered talks to reprise his role from the Tim Burton Batman films in the DCEU film The Flash, which is set for release in 2023. According to The Hollywood Reporter, Warner Bros. hoped for Keaton to return for multiple DCEU films in a way "akin to the role played by Samuel L. Jackson as Nick Fury in the Marvel Cinematic Universe, something of a mentor or guide or even string-puller." In August 2020, Keaton officially signed on, with Ben Affleck also announced to be reprising his version of the character for the film. Affleck stated that his scenes in the film were his favorite as the character.

Cameos (2016–present) 
In addition to major roles, Batman has made various cameo appearances in other DCU films.

 In Suicide Squad (2016), Batman appears in brief flashbacks depicting the arrests of Floyd Lawton / Deadshot and Harley Quinn. He rescues Harley from a submerged car after pursuing her and the Joker, and apprehends Deadshot while he is shopping with his daughter. Batman's history with Killer Croc is also referenced. At the film's conclusion, Amanda Waller—who appears to know that Bruce Wayne is Batman—provides Bruce with files on various metahumans in exchange for his protection from future fallout from the Enchantress' recent attack. Bruce tells Waller to shut down Task Force X, as his "friends" will handle future problems.
 Although he does not appear, Bruce Wayne is mentioned in Wonder Woman (2017). After the events of Batman v Superman: Dawn of Justice, Bruce successfully retrieves the photo from Luthor's archives which he used to threaten Diana Prince, along with a watch that belonged to the father of Captain Steve Trevor. He transports them through an armored car to Diana, with a letter wishing to know her story someday. Diana recalls the events of the film as a flashback, after which she sends an e-mail to Bruce that reads "Thanks for bringing him back to me".
 Bill Dean voices a toy version of Batman in Shazam! (2019).

Joker (2019) 

A child version of Wayne is portrayed by Dante Pereira-Olson in Joker, directed by Todd Phillips. 
The film is set during the 1980s, where a failed stand-up comedian named Arthur Fleck turns to a life of crime and chaos in Gotham City. Bruce Wayne encounters Fleck when the latter attempts and fails to gain entry into Wayne Manor. He is later seen in a darkened alley with the remains of his parents, who had been fatally shot by an assailant who wears a clown mask.

The Batman franchise (2022–present)

In February 2017, Matt Reeves was hired to direct The Batman, replacing Ben Affleck who wrote the original script until it was replaced by Reeves and Peter Craig. Reeves initially had plans to keep The Batman in the DCEU; however, due to creative differences, the film would focus on a younger Batman, ultimately serving as a reboot from the one seen in the DCEU. In May 2019, Robert Pattinson was cast as Bruce Wayne / Batman and is set to appear in three films, cumulating an eventual trilogy. In 2020, DC Films president Walter Hamada stated that there would be two Batmans existing simultaneously via multiverse. Later in the year, two spin-offs were announced from The Batman: a series centered on the Gotham City Police Department and one on the crime lord The Penguin (portrayed by Colin Farrell in the film). However, the GCPD series was cancelled due to creative differences, with an additional spin-off centered on the Arkham State Hospital being announced in March 2022, with early development on a second film having begun by then.

DC Universe

The Brave and the Bold
A film featuring Bruce Wayne / Batman and Damian Wayne / Robin titled The Brave and the Bold was revealed to be in development at DC Studios in January 2023. It will be an installment of the upcoming DC Universe (DCU) film slate and will exist separately from future projects in Matt Reeves' The Batman franchise. It is also based on Grant Morrison’s run of Batman from 2006–2013.

Animated films

Batman solo 
Theatrical
 1993: Mask of the Phantasm, set in the continuity of Batman: The Animated Series with Kevin Conroy voicing Batman
 2016: Batman: The Killing Joke, an adaptation of Batman: The Killing Joke with Kevin Conroy voicing Batman
 2016: Batman: Return of the Caped Crusaders, based on the Batman television series with Adam West voicing Batman

Direct-to-video
 1998: Subzero, set in the continuity of Batman: The Animated Series with Kevin Conroy voicing Batman
 2000: Return of the Joker, set in the continuity of Batman Beyond with Will Friedle voicing Batman and Kevin Conroy voicing Bruce Wayne.
 2003: Mystery of the Batwoman, set in the continuity of The New Batman Adventures with Kevin Conroy voicing Batman
 2005: The Batman vs. Dracula, set in the continuity of The Batman with Rino Romano voicing Batman
 2010: Under the Red Hood, an adaptation of Batman: Under the Hood with Bruce Greenwood voicing Batman
 2011: Year One, an adaptation of Batman: Year One with Benjamin McKenzie voicing Batman
 2012: The Dark Knight Returns – Part 1, an adaptation of the first half of The Dark Knight Returns with Peter Weller voicing Batman
 2013: The Dark Knight Returns – Part 2, an adaptation of the second half of The Dark Knight Returns with Peter Weller voicing Batman
 2013: DC Super Heroes Unite, an adaptation of Lego Batman 2: DC Super Heroes with Troy Baker voicing Batman
 2014: Son of Batman, a loose adaptation of Batman and Son with Jason O'Mara voicing Batman
 2014: Assault on Arkham, set in the continuity of Batman: Arkham with Kevin Conroy voicing Batman
 2015: Batman vs. Robin an animated film with Jason O'Mara voicing Batman
 2015: Batman Unlimited: Animal Instincts, an animated film with Roger Craig Smith voicing Batman
 2015: Batman Unlimited: Monster Mayhem, an animated film with Roger Craig Smith voicing Batman
 2016: Batman Unlimited: Mechs vs. Mutants, an animated film with Roger Craig Smith voicing Batman
 2016: Batman: Bad Blood, an animated film also featuring Batwoman and Batwing with Jason O'Mara voicing Batman
 2017: Batman and Harley Quinn, an animated film with Kevin Conroy voicing Batman
 2017: Batman vs. Two-Face, based on the Batman television series with Adam West voicing Batman for final time before his death
 2018: Batman: Gotham by Gaslight, an animated film based on the one-shot graphic novel of the same name with Bruce Greenwood voicing Batman
 2018: Batman Ninja, an animated film with Kōichi Yamadera and Roger Craig Smith voicing Batman in Japanese and English respectively.
2019: Batman: Hush, based on the 2002 comic book story arc of the same name with Jason O'Mara voicing Batman.
 2021: Batman: Soul of the Dragon, an animated film with David Giuntoli voicing Batman
 2021: Batman: The Long Halloween Part 1 and Part 2, a two part animated film based on Batman: The Long Halloween with Jensen Ackles voicing Batman.

Ensemble

Theatrical 
 2017: DC Super Heroes vs. Eagle Talon, with Takayuki Yamada voicing Batman
 2018: Teen Titans Go! To the Movies with Jimmy Kimmel voicing Batman.
 2022: DC League of Super-Pets, with Keanu Reeves voicing Batman.

Direct-to-video
 2008: Justice League: The New Frontier, based on the comic of the same name with Jeremy Sisto voicing Batman
 2009: Superman/Batman: Public Enemies, based on the comic of the same name with Kevin Conroy voicing Batman
 2010: Justice League: Crisis on Two Earths, a loose adaptation of various DC comics with William Baldwin voicing Batman
 2010: Superman/Batman: Apocalypse, based on Superman/Batman: The Supergirl from Krypton with Kevin Conroy voicing Batman
 2010: DC Super Friends: The Joker's Playhouse, based on the Fisher-Price toyline with Daran Norris voicing Batman
 2012: Justice League: Doom, based on JLA: Tower of Babel with Kevin Conroy voicing Batman
 2013: Justice League: The Flashpoint Paradox, based on Flashpoint with Kevin McKidd voicing Batman
 2014: JLA Adventures: Trapped in Time, an original story with Diedrich Bader voicing Batman
 2014: Justice League: War, based on Justice League: Origin with Jason O'Mara voicing Batman
 2014: Lego DC Comics Super Heroes: Batman Be-Leaguered animated television special, with Troy Baker reprising his role as Batman from the Lego video games.
 2015: Justice League: Throne of Atlantis, based on Throne of Atlantis with Jason O'Mara voicing Batman
 2015: Justice League: Gods and Monsters with Michael C. Hall voicing a Kirk Langstrom version of Batman
 2015: Lego DC Comics Super Heroes: Justice League vs. Bizarro League, with Troy Baker reprising his role
 2016: Lego DC Comics Super Heroes: Justice League – Cosmic Clash, with Troy Baker reprising his role
 2017: Justice League Dark, with Jason O'Mara voicing Batman
 2018: Scooby-Doo! & Batman: The Brave and the Bold, with Diedrich Bader voicing Batman
 2018: Lego DC Comics Super Heroes: The Flash, with Troy Baker voicing Batman
 2018: Lego DC Comics Super Heroes: Aquaman: Rage of Atlantis, with Troy Baker voicing Batman
 2018: The Death of Superman and Reign of the Supermen, based on The Death of Superman with Jason O'Mara voicing Batman
 2019: Batman vs. Teenage Mutant Ninja Turtles, with Troy Baker voicing Batman
 2020: Lego DC: Shazam!: Magic and Monsters, with Troy Baker voicing Batman
 2020: Superman: Red Son, with Roger Craig Smith voicing Batman.
 2020: Justice League Dark: Apokolips War, with Jason O'Mara voicing Batman
 2021: Injustice, an animated film based on the 2013 video game Injustice: Gods Among Us, featuring a parallel universe in the DC Multiverse, with Anson Mount voicing Batman.

The Lego Movie series 
 2014: A Lego-themed version of Batman appears in The Lego Movie, voiced by Will Arnett.
 2017: The character receives his own spin-off film, The Lego Batman Movie, voiced again by Arnett. This film takes place in a universe where all of the previous live-action films, as well as some animated series, the preceding film, and the 1966 TV series (which the film mocks in multiple instances) have somehow happened. Despite this, the film works as an origin story for both Robin and Batgirl, and is established in Lego Dimensions to be set in the Lego DC universe, distinct from The Lego Movie universe.
 2019: Arnett reprised his role as Lego Batman in The Lego Movie 2: The Second Part.

Other 
 2008: Batman: Gotham Knight, a collection of original shorts with Kevin Conroy voicing Batman
 2020: Batman: Death in the Family, an interactive short film based on the story arc from the comics that allows the viewer to choose different outcomes of the story; featuring Bruce Greenwood voicing Batman

Recurring cast and characters

Additionally, President pro tempore of the United States Senate, Patrick Leahy has a brief role as himself in Batman Forever, and Batman & Robin, an unnamed Wayne Enterprise board member in The Dark Knight, and The Dark Knight Rises, and as Senator Purrington in Batman v Superman: Dawn of Justice respectively.

Reception

Box office performance
With a total gross of over $6.83 billion at the global box office, the series is seventh highest-grossing film franchise of all time. Domestically, Batman films have grossed U.S. $3,158,097,126, making the franchise the fourth-highest-grossing film series in North America. Critical reception of the modern films has varied throughout its different eras. The Dark Knight, from Christopher Nolan's trilogy, is considered one of the best superhero movies ever, while two entries, Batman and Robin and Catwoman are considered some of the worst. The Dark Knight Rises is the highest-grossing Batman movie, grossing $1,081,041,287 worldwide, while Batman and Robin is the lowest-grossing film to feature Batman, at $238,207,122 worldwide.

Critical and public response 

Of the 1980s and 1990s, Tim Burton's films received positive critical reviews for their return of the character to a more serious portrayal, though some felt that Batman Returns was too dark. Joel Schumacher's two films received mixed reviews, particularly Batman and Robin, which has the lowest aggregate scores out of any film in the series. Conversely, the films in Christopher Nolan's trilogy of the 2000s and 2010s have the highest scores on review aggregation websites of the live-action feature films with The Dark Knight receiving a 94% from Rotten Tomatoes and an 84 from Metacritic. Batman's newer iterations in the 2010s DCEU received mixed reviews from critics.

The series' theatrically released animated movies have a large critical disparity, with Mask of the Phantasm and The Lego Batman Movie being well-received while Batman: The Killing Joke received mixed reviews.

Accolades 
Films in the series have earned three Academy Awards (Burton's Batman for Production Design and The Dark Knight for Sound Editing and posthumous Best Supporting Actor for Heath Ledger's performance as the Joker), one BAFTA (also for Ledger), and ten Saturn Awards, which honor excellence in science fiction, horror, and fantasy.

Academy Awards

British Academy Film Awards

Saturn Awards

See also 

 Batman franchise media
 :Category:Fan films based on Batman
 Superman in film
 Catwoman (film)

References

External links 
 Batman franchise overview at Box Office Mojo

Film series introduced in 1943
Warner Bros. Pictures franchises